Re City Equitable Fire Insurance Co [1925] Ch 407 is a UK company law case concerning directors' duties, and in particular the duty of care. It is no longer good law, as it stipulated that a "subjective" standard of competence applied. Now under Companies Act 2006 section 174, and given the development of the common law in Re D'Jan of London Ltd, directors owe an objective standard of care based on what should reasonably be expected from someone in their position.

Facts
The company lost £1,200,000 in failure of investments and the large scale fraud of the chairman, Gerard Lee Bevan, ‘a daring and unprincipled scoundrel’. The liquidator sued the other directors for negligence. The auditors were sued too, but the Court of Appeal held they were honest and exonerated by provisions in the company’s articles.

Judgment

High Court
Romer J held that some of the directors did breach their duty of care. But they were not liable to reimburse, because an exclusion clause for negligence was valid. And even in absence of exclusion clauses, in his view, ‘for a director acting honestly himself to be held legally liable for negligence, in trusting the officers under him not to conceal from him what they ought to report to him appears to us to be laying too heavy a burden on honest businessmen.’ Though he felt ‘some difficulty’ with the distinction, negligence would need to be ‘gross’ to visit liability. The principles he set out as follows.

Court of Appeal
Pollock MR Warrington LJ and Sargant LJ upheld Romer J's decision.

See also
UK company law

Notes

References

United Kingdom company case law
Court of Appeal (England and Wales) cases
1925 in case law
1925 in British law
Insurance in the United Kingdom
Corporate governance in the United Kingdom